Gustav Weigand (1 February 1860 – 8 July 1930), was a German linguist and specialist in Balkan languages, especially Romanian and Aromanian. He is known for his seminal contributions to the dialectology of the Romance languages of the Balkans and to the study of the relationships between the languages of the Balkan sprachbund. He has also provided substantial contribution to Aromanian studies.

Weigand was born in Duisburg, in the Prussian Rhine Province. He studied Romance languages in Leipzig and wrote a doctoral thesis about the language of the Aromanians in Livadi in the region of Mount Olympus in 1888, followed by a habilitation thesis on the Megleno-Romanian language in 1892. In 1893 he founded the Romanian Institute at the University of Leipzig, the first such institution outside Romania. During the following years he continued to conduct extensive personal field studies in the Balkans. In 1908 he published a Linguistic Atlas of the Daco-Romanian speech area, the first work of its kind in the field of Romance linguistics. During the First World War he was sent by the German authorities to conduct ethnographic studies in Macedonia, then under German occupation. The results were published in 1923.

In recognition of his research on the Romanian language, Gustav Weigand was elected as a foreign member of the Romanian Academy in 1892. He was also a foreign member of the Bulgarian Academy of Sciences and of the Macedonian Scientific Institute. He died in Belgershain.

Major works

(1888): Die Sprache der Olympo-Walachen. Johann Ambrosius Barth: Leipzig.
(1892): Vlacho-Meglen. Eine ethnographisch-philologische Untersuchung. Leipzig.
(1908): Linguistischer Atlas des dacorumänischen Sprachgebiets. Barth: Leipzig.
(1923): Ethnographie Makedoniens. Leipzig.

References
Bochmann, Klaus (2005). "Gustav Weigand: Zum 75. Todestag am 8. Juli 2005". University of Leipzig. (pdf)

External links
 

1860 births
1930 deaths
People from Duisburg
People from the Rhine Province
German philologists
Corresponding members of the Romanian Academy
Corresponding Members of the Bulgarian Academy of Sciences
Members of the Macedonian Scientific Institute
Aromanian studies
Balkan studies